This was the first edition of the tournament.

Roman Jebavý and Jan Šátral won the tournament, defeating Norbert Gombos and Adam Pavlásek in the final, 6–2, 6–2.

Seeds 

 Gero Kretschmer /  Alexander Satschko (semifinals)
 Mateusz Kowalczyk /  Igor Zelenay (first round)
 Roberto Maytín /  Miguel Ángel Reyes-Varela (first round)
 Alexander Bury /  Andriej Kapaś (first round)

Draw

Draw

References 
 Main Draw

Poprad-Tatry ATP Challenger Tour - Doubles